The 2017 CS Lombardia Trophy was a senior international figure skating competition held in September 2017 in Bergamo, Italy. It was part of the 2017–18 ISU Challenger Series. Medals were awarded in the disciplines of men's singles, ladies' singles, pair skating, and ice dance.

Entries 
Each country was allowed to enter up to three entries per discipline. The International Skating Union published the entry lists on 22 August 2017:

 Withdrew before starting orders were drawn
 Men: Daniel Albert Naurits (EST), Denis Ten (KAZ)
 Ladies: Helery Hälvin (EST)
 Pairs: Alexandra Herbríková / Nicolas Roulet (SUI)
 Ice dance: Sara Hurtado / Kirill Khaliavin (ESP)

 Added
 Men: Brendan Kerry (AUS), Samuel Koppel (EST)
 Ladies: Annely Vahi (EST)

Senior results

Men

Ladies

Pairs

Ice dance

References

Citations

External links 
 2017 Lombardia Trophy at the International Skating Union
 Results

Lombardia Trophy
Lombardia Trophy
Lombardia Trophy